Dujaq Rural District is in Samarin District of Ardabil County, Ardabil province, Iran. Its constituent villages had previously been a part of Gharbi Rural District in the Central District at the time of the 2006 census. At the census of 2011, there were 4,186 inhabitants in 1,054 households, and in the most recent census of 2016, the population had decreased to 3,535 in 1,063 households. The largest of its 16 villages was Gendishmin, with 763 people.

References 

Ardabil County

Rural Districts of Ardabil Province

Populated places in Ardabil Province

Populated places in Ardabil County

fa:دهستان دوجاق